Jesse is the fourth and final studio album by American singer Jesse Powell. It was released on October 14, 2003 through D3 Entertainment,  Monopoly Music and Riviera Records.

Critical reception

Vibe editor Laura Checkoway wrote that "after three albums and no remarkable hits, Jesse Powell hasn't completely fallen off the R&B map. And while this, his fourth effort, won't help him make a sudden takeover, it attempts to keep his name, if not his music, humming in our ears [...] There's plenty of smooth romance to go around, but none of the grit, grain, passion, and pain that push the heart's buttons and make music memorable."

Track listing

Notes
 denotes co-producer

Charts

References

External links

2003 albums
Jesse Powell albums